The 30th International Film Festival of India was held from 10–20 January 1999 in Hyderabad, India. The non-competitive edition was restricted to lifetime achievement awards, and tributes. Argentina was the country of focus in the festival, whilst Bollywood actor Dev Anand was the chief guest.

Winners
Lifetime Achievement Award - Bernardo Bertolucci (Italy)

Opening Film
Elizabeth by Shekhar Kapur

Woman in Cinema Honors
Bhanumathi Ramakrishna - Holding Sway for 60 years
Shabana Azmi - The Icon and the Actress
Savitri - A Moon Among Stars

Honors
Homage - Akira Kurosawa (Japan)
Centenary Tribute - Sergei Eisenstein (Russia)

Tributes
Theo Angelopoulos (Greece)
Hou Hsiao-hsien (Taiwan) 
Zsolt Kézdi-Kovács (Hungary)

References

1999 film festivals
India 30th
1999 in Indian cinema